Banda is a surname. Notable people with the surname include:

Arts and entertainment
Banda Kanakalingeshwara Rao (1907–1968), Indian stage actor
Lucius Banda (born 1970), Malawian musician and politician

Military
Abdallah Banda (born 1963), Sudanese military commander
Banda Singh Bahadur (1670–1716), Sikh military leader

Politicians
Aleke Banda (1939–2010), Malawian politician
Banda Karthika Reddy (born 1977), Indian politician
Chimunthu Banda, Malawian politician
Etta Banda, Minister of Foreign Affairs of Malawi
Hastings Banda (1898–1997), former President of Malawi
Joyce Banda (born 1950), President of Malawi
M. D. Banda (born 1914), Sri Lankan politician
Michael Banda (1930–2014), British-Sri Lankan Trotskyist
Rupiah Banda (1937–2022), President of Zambia

Sports
Anthony Banda (born 1993), American baseball player
Carlos Banda (born 1978), Chilean-Swedish football manager
Chikondi Banda (1979–2013), Malawian footballer
Christopher John Banda (1974–2009), Malawian footballer
Davi Banda (born 1983), Malawian footballer
Dennis Banda (born 1988), Zambian football goalkeeper
Elizet Banda (born 1988), Zambian runner
Gift Banda (born 1969), Zimbabwean soccer administrator
Gilbert Banda (born 1983), Zimbabwean football player
Jacob Banda (born 1988), Zambian footballer 
Kumbulani Banda (born 1989), Zimbabwean footballer
Lewis Banda (born 1982), Zimbabwean sprinter
Patrick Banda (1974–1993), Zambian footballer
Peter Banda (born 2000), Malawian footballer
Richard Banda, Malawian jurist and athlete
Sead Banda (born 1990), Montenegrin footballer

Other people
Bobbie Banda (1947–2013), American Juaneño elder
Gongalegoda Banda (1809–1849), Sri Lankan rebellion leader
Siva Subrahmanyam Banda, Indian-American aerospace engineer
Sylvia Banda, Zambian restaurateur

Zambian surnames